Ticknevin is a townland in the parish of Carbury in County Kildare, Ireland.

The Grand Canal runs through Ticknevin and the 20th canal lock is located there. There is also a humpback bridge which was built by the English engineer Thomas Hartley in the 18th century.

References

Townlands of County Kildare